Francis James Mulheron (1918–1990) was an Australian rugby league footballer who played in the 1940s.

Mulheron was graded from the Brighton juniors in 1943 and was playing first grade in 1944. A fitness fanatic,  Mulheron was a big prop forward who was also a noted sculler with Glebe Rowing Club and the South Narrabeen Surf Club. He retired from playing in 1946. to concentrate on the sport of Rowing.

Death
Mulheron died at Brighton-Le-Sands on 22 April 1990.

References

St. George Dragons players
Australian rugby league players
Rugby league props
1918 births
1990 deaths